Hong Kong Community College (HKCC) is an affiliated and financially self-supporting college of the Hong Kong Polytechnic University, a public research university in Hong Kong. Initially located on the PolyU campus, HKCC now has two campuses separated from the university.

HKCC offers associate degree and higher diploma programmes spanning the domains of arts, science, social sciences, business and the specialised areas of design and health studies for secondary school leavers.

Since its establishment, HKCC has helped over 36,600 graduates matriculate into bachelor’s degree programmes.

History
The HKCC was first established in rented premises in 2001 and initially provided 800 self-financing sub-degree student places.

On 27 June 2003, the Finance Committee of Hong Kong's Legislative Council approved a loan to the Polytechnic University to be used to construct a campus for HKCC in Hung Hom.

To accommodate the growth of the college, a second campus was opened in Yau Ma Tei.

Campuses
Hong Kong Community College has two campuses:

PolyU Hung Hom Bay Campus, built in 2007 
Address: 8 Hung Lok Road, Hung Hom. (near The Hong Kong Polytechnic University and The Hong Kong Polytechnic University Student Halls of Residence)
PolyU West Kowloon Campus, built in 2008
Address: 9 Hoi Ting Road, Yau Ma Tei. (near Charming Garden)

Associate Degree & Higher Diploma Programmes
Associate Degree

Higher Diploma

Photos of the campuses

Notable people 
 Lau Siu-lai – legislator, HKCC lecturer
 Jimmy Sham – human rights activist

References

External links
 

2001 establishments in Hong Kong
Educational institutions established in 2001
Hong Kong Polytechnic University
Hung Hom
Universities and colleges in Hong Kong